The Copa do Brasil is a knockout football competition played by 92 teams, representing all 26 Brazilian states plus the Federal District. It is the Brazilian domestic cup and the Brazilian equivalent of the FA Cup, Taça de Portugal, Copa del Rey, Scottish Cup and Copa Argentina. The Copa do Brasil is an opportunity for teams from smaller states to play against the big teams. The winner of the cup automatically qualifies for the following edition of the Copa Libertadores de América, the most prestigious continental football tournament contested by top clubs in South America organized by CONMEBOL.

Initially the Copa do Brasil was contested by 32 clubs. The field increased to 40 in 1996, increased to 69 by the year of 2000, and stabilized at 64 after 2001 which it remained at until 2012. Clubs from all 26 Brazilian states and the Federal District participate.

From 2001 to 2012, the Copa do Brasil was played in the first half of the year and in those seasons, due to busy scheduling, teams playing in the Copa Libertadores did not participate in the Copa do Brasil in the same year. Thus, the Copa do Brasil champion never defended their title in the next edition, since they would be qualified for the Copa Libertadores that year.

From 2013 to 2015, 87 teams participate in the cup and the teams that compete in the Copa Libertadores join the Copa do Brasil directly in the Round of 16. Also, the best 8 teams from the previous year's Campeonato Brasileiro Série A eliminated up to the third round qualify for Copa Sudamericana. In 2016, the competition was played by 86 clubs. From 2017 to 2020 the cup was contested by 91 teams but in 2021 the number of participants was increased to 92.

Starting in 2023, the tournament has been sponsored by Betano and is thus currently known as the Copa Betano do Brasil for sponsorship reasons.

Cruzeiro is the most successful club, having won the competition six times, followed by Grêmio with 5 titles, Palmeiras and Flamengo with 4, Corinthians with 3, and Atlético Mineiro with 2. Another 10 clubs have won one edition of the competition, resulting in a total of 16 champions. The state with the highest number of titles is São Paulo , with 10. Only two states have champions from more than one city: São Paulo (Jundiaí, Santo André, Santos and São Paulo) and Rio Grande do Sul (Caxias do Sul and Porto Alegre). Rio de Janeiro is the only city with more than two champion clubs (Flamengo, Fluminense and Vasco da Gama).

Format
The competition is a single elimination knockout tournament featuring two-legged ties (in the third round onwards). In the first two rounds, the winner is known after a single leg. The first round is played in the lowest ranked team stadium, with the away team having a draw advantage to qualify.

Since the tournament's creation in 1989, the winner of the tournament qualifies for the next year's Copa Libertadores de América.

Eligible teams
The eligible teams to compete in the Copa do Brasil are the previous year's Copa do Brasil champion, the 70 best-placed clubs in the state championships (in which the number of spots per state range from one to five clubs), the top six clubs from the previous year's Campeonato Brasileiro Série A, the Copa do Nordeste (Northeast Cup) champion, the Copa Verde (Green Cup) champion, the ten highest-ranked clubs in CBF's ranking not already qualified, and two of the following: the Brazilian champion of the most recent Copa Libertadores (if there is one), the Brazilian champion of the most recent Copa Sudamericana (if there is one), the 7th place team of Campeonato Brasileiro Série A, or the champion of Campeonato Brasileiro Série B.

The 7 Brazilians teams in the Copa Libertadores da América, the best placed teams in the previous year's Série A and Série B (or the champion of Copa Libertadores and/or Copa Sudamericana, if it is a Brazilian team) and Copa do Nordeste and Copa Verde's Title Holders will join the Copa do Brasil directly in Round of 16.

History
The Copa do Brasil was created in 1989 to appease the state soccer federations with fewer large and traditional clubs on the national stage, whose representatives would hardly have the opportunity to face big clubs during the year. This concern arose after a decrease in the number of participants in the 1987 Campeonato Brasileiro, when 13 of the biggest clubs in Brazil broke away to form the Copa União (Union Cup) in response to the CBF's financial difficulties.

The creation of this competition was designed to promote the state championships in the North, Northeast and Central West regions of Brazil, which were no longer represented in the Brazilian Championship. Copa do Brasil is of high importance for the medium and small clubs in these regions who now, at least theoretically, have a path to qualify for the Copa Libertadores.

The first edition of the Copa do Brasil took place in 1989. The first goal in the cup's history was scored by Alcindo Sartori in a 2–0 victory by Flamengo over Paysandu. Gremio were the first champion, qualifying to compete in the 1990 Copa Libertadores.

From 1989 to 1993, the champion of that year took home the trophy. In 1994 it was determined that the club that won the Copa do Brasil three times would have final possession of the cup. This happened in 2001 with Grêmio (after winning in 1994, 1997 and 2001).

Thus, for the 2002 Copa do Brasil a new trophy was contested, which remained until 2007 with no club earning its final possession.

By winning the 2003 Copa do Brasil and the 2003 Campeonato Brasileiro, Cruzeiro won both the domestic cup and domestic league in the same year, a feat that was  matched only once in Brazilian football by Atlético Mineiro in 2021. Atlético has also won the 2021 Campeonato Mineiro, their state championship, as Cruzeiro did in 2003, completing the domestic treble (State league, national league and cup).

In 2008, a new trophy was instituted for the Copa do Brasil. In that same year Sport Recife became the first and so far only club from outside the Southeast Region or the South Region to win the competition. The North Region and Center-West regions have had no representative win the cup so far.

Grêmio's victory over Atletico Mineiro in the first leg of the 2016 Copa do Brasil final was the first time ever that a visiting club won the first leg of the Copa do Brasil final, in the 28 editions of the competition.

The number of participating teams has varied during the competition's history, based on the number of teams that qualify through their state federation's league tournament. From 1989 to 1994, 32 teams participated. That number was increased in 1995 to 36 teams, in 1996 to 40 teams, and in 1997 to 45 teams.  42 teams participated in 1998, 65 in 1999 and 69 in 2000.

From 2001 to 2012, the format was consolidated to 64 teams, without teams that participated in the Copa Libertadores that year due to conflict of dates.

In 2013, CBF presented a new cup trophy to replace the trophy in dispute since 2008. The champion gets permanent possession of the trophy and an identical trophy will be produced for the following year. Also in 2013, the tournament format was expanded again to 87 teams, which remained through 2014 and 2015. Under the new format, teams participating in Copa Libertadores again competed in the Copa do Brasil, entering the tournament directly into the Round of 16. In 2016 the number of participants was increased to 86, in 2017 to 91 and in 2021 to 92.

Records and statistics

Finalists

Performance by State

Top scorers

See also

Copa do Brasil de Futebol Feminino, the women's version of Copa do Brasil.

References

External links

 Website official

Other 
 Copa do Brasil Copa do Brasil
 Brazil Cup History, RSSSF.com

 
Copa do Brasil
Brazil
Recurring sporting events established in 1989
Professional sports leagues in Brazil
1989 establishments in Brazil